Goudelancourt may refer to several communes in France:
 Goudelancourt-lès-Berrieux, in the Aisne department
 Goudelancourt-lès-Pierrepont, in the Aisne department